The 1959 Liberty Bowl, part of the 1959 bowl game season, took place on December 19, 1959, at Philadelphia Municipal Stadium in Philadelphia, Pennsylvania. It was the inaugural edition of the Liberty Bowl. The competing teams were the Alabama Crimson Tide, representing the Southeastern Conference (SEC), and the Penn State Nittany Lions, competing as a football independent. In a game dominated by both defenses, Penn State was victorious in by a final score of 7–0.  The game is notable as the first football game Alabama every played against an integrated team.

Teams

Alabama

The 1959 Alabama squad finished the regular season with a 7–1–2 record and played in a bowl for the first time since the 1954 Cotton Bowl Classic. After Navy turned down an offer, Alabama accepted a bid to play in the inaugural Liberty Bowl on November 30. The game was the first bowl for Bear Bryant as head coach of the Crimson Tide.

Penn State

After starting the season 7–0, Penn State dropped two of their final three games to finish the regular season with a record of 8–2. The Nittany Lions accepted a bid for the Liberty Bowl on November 23 with the other opponent identified as being either Georgia, Georgia Tech, SMU or Navy. Alabama was selected as the opponent after Navy turned down an offer. The game marked the first bowl for Penn State since the 1948 Cotton Bowl Classic.

Game summary
In a game dominated by both defenses, the only points were scored at the end of the second quarter by the Nittany Lions on a fake field goal. This lone touchdown was scored by Roger Kochman on a 17-yard reception from Galen Hall with Sam Stellatella adding the extra point.

See also
 Alabama–Penn State football rivalry

References

1959–60 NCAA football bowl games
1959
1959
1959
December 1959 sports events in the United States
Liberty Bowl